Michał Dziubek (born 20 April 1999) is a Polish professional footballer who plays as a midfielder for KTS Weszło Warsaw.

References

External links

1999 births
Sportspeople from Kielce
Living people
Polish footballers
Association football midfielders
Skra Częstochowa players
Korona Kielce players
KTS Weszło Warsaw players
Ekstraklasa players
III liga players
IV liga players